Ponzone is a comune (municipality) in the Province of Alessandria in the Italian region Piedmont, located about  southeast of Turin and about  southwest of Alessandria.

Ponzone borders the following municipalities: Cartosio, Cassinelle, Cavatore, Grognardo, Malvicino, Molare, Morbello, Pareto, Sassello, Tiglieto, and Urbe.

Demographic evolution

References

Cities and towns in Piedmont